Sukharevo is the name of several rural localities in Russia:
Sukharevo, Arkhangelsk Oblast, a village in Yemetsky Selsoviet of Kholmogorsky District of Arkhangelsk Oblast
Sukharevo, Belgorod Oblast, a selo in Borchansky Rural Okrug of Valuysky District of Belgorod Oblast
Sukharevo, Kostroma Oblast, a village in Petrovskoye Settlement of Chukhlomsky District of Kostroma Oblast
Sukharevo, Mytishchinsky District, Moscow Oblast, a village in Fedoskinskoye Rural Settlement of Mytishchinsky District of Moscow Oblast
Sukharevo, Ruzsky District, Moscow Oblast, a village in Staroruzskoye Rural Settlement of Ruzsky District of Moscow Oblast
Sukharevo, Novgorod Oblast, a village in Gorskoye Settlement of Volotovsky District of Novgorod Oblast
Sukharevo, Oryol Oblast, a village in Bortnovsky Selsoviet of Zalegoshchensky District of Oryol Oblast
Sukharevo, Dedovichsky District, Pskov Oblast, a village in Dedovichsky District of Pskov Oblast
Sukharevo, Dnovsky District, Pskov Oblast, a village in Dnovsky District of Pskov Oblast
Sukharevo, Novorzhevsky District, Pskov Oblast, a village in Novorzhevsky District of Pskov Oblast
Sukharevo, Ryazan Oblast, a village in Smoleyevsky Rural Okrug of Ukholovsky District of Ryazan Oblast
Sukharevo, Republic of Tatarstan, a selo in Nizhnekamsky District of the Republic of Tatarstan
Sukharevo, Tomsk Oblast, a village in Tomsky District of Tomsk Oblast
Sukharevo, Tula Oblast, a village in Gvardeysky Rural Okrug of Dubensky District of Tula Oblast
Sukharevo, Kalininsky District, Tver Oblast, a village in Turginovskoye Rural Settlement of Kalininsky District of Tver Oblast
Sukharevo, Kalyazinsky District, Tver Oblast, a village in Nerlskoye Rural Settlement of Kalyazinsky District of Tver Oblast
Sukharevo, Udmurt Republic, a village in Galanovsky Selsoviet of Karakulinsky District of the Udmurt Republic
Sukharevo, Ust-Kubinsky District, Vologda Oblast, a village in Tomashsky Selsoviet of Ust-Kubinsky District of Vologda Oblast
Sukharevo, Vashkinsky District, Vologda Oblast, a village in Kisnemsky Selsoviet of Vashkinsky District of Vologda Oblast
Sukharevo, Danilovsky District, Yaroslavl Oblast, a village in Fedurinsky Rural Okrug of Danilovsky District of Yaroslavl Oblast
Sukharevo, Yaroslavsky District, Yaroslavl Oblast, a village in Tolbukhinsky Rural Okrug of Yaroslavsky District of Yaroslavl Oblast